Hudbay Minerals Inc. is a diversified Canadian mining company primarily producing copper concentrate (containing copper, gold, and silver) and zinc metal. Much of its history has centered on Flin Flon, Manitoba, where it has mined for over 90 years. Hudbay currently has operations in Manitoba and Peru, and is working towards building a copper mine in southern Arizona. The company also has exploration properties in Canada, Peru, Chile and the United States.

History

Hudson Bay Mining and Smelting Co.
The Flin Flon orebody was discovered by David Collins, a local trapper, and shown to prospector Tom Creighton in 1914. The first claim was registered in 1915. It took more than a dozen years to bring the mine into production because the huge, high grade ore body required large amounts of hydro energy, was isolated, and copper production required a smelter.

In 1927, Cornelius Vanderbilt Whitney (a member of the Whitney family of New York), along with Newmont Mining Corp and Mining Corp of Canada Ltd., founded Hudson Bay Mining & Smelting (HBM&S), which took over controlling interest in the Flin Flon property. By 1930, the mine, smelter, hydroelectric dam and railroad were in full operation. Eight years later, the company was listed on the New York Stock Exchange under the symbol HBM. In 1958, Hudbay opened its first mine in Snow Lake, 215 kilometres east of Flin Flon. Six years later, production began at Stall Lake Mine. In the 1960s, Hudbay also gained a new major investor, Anglo America, a South African mining company.

Throughout the 1970s and 1980s, Hudbay continued to mine and explore in and around Flin Flon and Snow Lake, discovering new deposits, such as Trout Lake and Chisel North, and starting production at new mines, like Anderson Lake. After more than 60 years in operation, in 1992, Hudbay closed its original Flin Flon mine; however, one year later, as a result of underground exploration, Hudbay discovered a substantial orebody that would become its flagship 777 mine in Flin Flon.

Hudbay Minerals Inc.

On December 21, 2004, OntZinc Corporation acquired HBM&S for C$316 million from Anglo American plc. The purchase was financed by a public offering of C$143.8 million of equity and the issue of US$175 million of debt. The company then changed its name to Hudbay Minerals Inc.

Hudbay was also listed on the TSX under the symbol HBM.

In 2007, Hudbay located a significant zinc deposit near Snow Lake that became known as Lalor.  The deposit also contained a large volume of gold, large enough to support its own mine. Initial production began in 2012 and the mine officially opened in September 2014.

In 2008, shortly after the Lalor deposit recovery, the corporate head office relocated to Toronto, Ontario from Winnipeg, Manitoba.

In March 2011, Hudbay acquired Norsemont Mining Inc. and its Constancia copper mine in Peru for $520 million. Construction on the mine began in August 2012 and commercial production commenced in April 2015.

That same year, Hudbay acquired the New Britannia mill from QMX Gold in Manitoba. Plans to refurbish the mill were shared by Hudbay in February 2019 as part of its updated plan to double gold production at Lalor.

Hudbay bought Augusta Resource Corporation in June 2014 and with it, acquired its Rosemont copper project in Arizona. Hudbay received all permits required to build and operate the mine, with the final record of decision received in June 2017 and 404 Water Permit received in March 2019. Following 10 years of consultations and studies, in August 2019 the U.S. District Court for the District of Arizona (“Court”) issued a ruling in the lawsuits challenging the U.S. Forest Service's issuance of the Final Record of Decision. As per the ruling, Hudbay was barred from proceeding with construction of the Rosemont project. As of 2020, Hudbay is in the process of appealing the decision.

In January 2018, Hudbay acquired mining properties near its Constancia mine in southern Peru. In December of the same year, the company announced the acquisition of all remaining issued and outstanding common shares of Mason Resources. This acquisition gave Hudbay ownership of the Ann Mason project in Nevada.

In March 2019, the company confirmed plans to shut down its operations in Flin Flon in the second quarter of 2022.

On February 18, 2020, the community of Chilloroya formally approved a surface rights agreement with Hudbay for the Pampacancha satellite deposit located near the Constancia mine in Peru.

In May 2020, Hudbay announced that it would be spending $115 million to refurbish its New Britannia Mill, expected to be completed in 2022.

Pan American Resources Inc.
Founded as Pan American Resources Inc., the company first went public on the Montreal Exchange under the symbol PAN in the 3rd quarter of 1996.

Pan American acquired all of OntZinc Corporation on March 12, 2002. Subsequently, the company renamed itself OntZinc Corporation on August 15, 2002. Upon acquisition of HBMS, the company renamed itself Hudbay Minerals Inc. on December 24, 2004.

On August 26, 2008, Hudbay Minerals announced the completion of a business combination with Skye Resources Inc. Skye Resources was renamed HMI Nickel, and was a subsidiary of Hudbay Minerals until Hudbay divested of the project through the sale of its interest in CGN to the Solway Group in September 2011.

In November 2008, Hudbay Minerals and Lundin Mining announced an agreement to merge. However, in February 2009, after a ruling by the Ontario Securities Commission that Hudbay must allow its shareholders to vote on the plan, the companies announced that the deal had been terminated after realizing it was unlikely to win shareholder support.

On January 9, 2009, Hudbay Minerals suspended operations (and continue on care and maintenance) at Chisel North Mine in Snow Lake, Manitoba. The mine stopped producing in late February 2009, due to falling zinc metal prices and increased costs, and restarted operations in 2010.

Operations

Directly, and through its subsidiaries, Hudbay owns three polymetallic mines, four ore concentrators and a zinc production facility in northern Manitoba and Saskatchewan (Canada) and Cusco (Peru), and copper projects in Arizona and Nevada (United States).

Hudbay currently operates two underground mines in the province of Manitoba. The 777 Mine is located in Flin Flon, and the Lalor Mine is located near Snow Lake. The 777 mine in Flin Flon produces zinc and copper along with lesser amounts of gold and silver, while the Lalor Mine produces gold, zinc and copper.

In Peru, Hudbay operates the Constancia mine, an open pit mine that achieved commercial production in 2015. The mine produces copper and molybdenum concentrates. Hudbay also owns Pampacancha, a high-grade satellite copper deposit located only four kilometres from the Constancia mine.

Hudbay owns two copper deposits in the United States, the Rosemont project, located in Arizona, and the Mason project, located in Nevada.

In 2019, Hudbay produced 137,179 tonnes of copper, 114,692 ounces of gold and 119,106 tonnes of zinc. The company reported that cash generated from operating activities decreased to $310.9 million from $479.6 million in 2018 and operating cash flow before change in non-cash working capital decreased to  $307.3 million from $501.4 million in 2018. The decrease is the result of lower copper sales volumes and lower margins mainly from lower realized base metal prices.

Controversy surrounding Hudbay's former Guatemalan operations 

The Fenix ferro-nickel project in Guatemala is owned by Compañía Guatemalteca de Niquel (CGN), which was 98.2% owned by Hudbay Minerals from August 2008 to September 2011. The Fenix Project in eastern Guatemala is a substantial brownfield nickel laterite mine and process plant that has been on care and maintenance since 1980.

Hudbay Minerals and two of its subsidiaries are subject to an ongoing $12 million lawsuit in Canada over the killing of a prominent Mayan community leader at the Fenix Mining Project.
The lawsuit alleges that on September 27, 2009, security personnel employed at the Fenix mine surrounded, beat and hacked at Adolfo Ich Chamán with machetes before shooting him in the head at close range in an unprovoked attack. An arrest warrant was issued for the Head of Security at the Fenix mine, Mynor Ronaldo Padilla Gonzáles. A non-governmental organization has referred to the murder as the "targeted killing of a well-known community leader." Amnesty International has stated with respect to the murder allegation "[t]he allegations are very serious, and Amnesty International calls for a swift, full and impartial investigation into the death of Adolfo Ich Chamán and other incidents of violence, to make the results public and to bring those responsible to justice".
On 6 January 2021 the mine's ex-security chief, Mynor Ronaldo Padilla Gonzáles pleaded guilty and was convicted of Indigenous leader Adolfo Ich Chamán's murder. The mining firm is also accused of litany of abuses in Central America.

Hudbay states that it and CGN have cooperated fully with all investigations conducted by Guatemalan authorities in connection with the incidents which occurred on September 27, 2009, in El Estor. CGN carried out an internal investigation and determined that none of its employees or security personnel were involved in the death of Chamán.

In June 2013, the Ontario Superior Court of Justice ruled that the Canadian company could be held legally responsible for crimes committed in Guatemala, including the alleged murder of Adolfo Ich Chamán and the alleged sexual assault of 11 women from Lote Ocho. A jury notice was filed in December 2013. As of February 2018, the court action was ongoing.

The Fenix mining project is also subject to ongoing land claims by local Mayan communities. In 2006, the International Labour Organization, an agency of the United Nations, ruled that Guatemala had breached international law by granting the Fenix mining concession without first consulting with local Mayan people. The ILO released a report discussing the violation in 2007.

In late 2006 and early 2007, Skye Resources (acquired by Hudbay Minerals in 2008, renamed HMI Nickel and subsequently sold by Hudbay in 2011) sought forced evictions of Mayan communities located on contested mine land. Homes were burned to the ground during these evictions.

References

External links
 
 Company Profile on SEDAR
 Choc v. HudBay Minerals Inc. and Caal v. HudBay Minerals Inc. – Lawsuits against HudBay Minerals Inc. over human rights abuses in Guatemala
 Website of Compañía Guatemalteca de Niquel

Mining companies of Canada
Copper mining companies of Canada
Nickel mining companies of Canada
Smelting
Companies based in Toronto
Non-renewable resource companies established in 1927
1927 establishments in Ontario
Non-renewable resource companies established in 1996
1996 establishments in Ontario
Copper mining companies of the United States
Companies listed on the New York Stock Exchange
Companies listed on the Toronto Stock Exchange
Metal companies of Canada
Flin Flon